Bimorgh (also Romanized as Bīmorgh; also known as Bīmūraq, Bī Mūrch, Bīmurgh, Bīmūrq, and Binurgh) is a village in Pas Kalut Rural District, in the Central District of Gonabad County, Razavi Khorasan Province, Iran. At the 2006 census, its population was 973, in 290 families.

References 

Populated places in Gonabad County